The Football Association of Ireland Senior Challenge Cup (FAI Cup), known as the Extra.ie FAI Cup for sponsorship reasons, is a knock-out association football competition contested annually by teams from the Republic of Ireland (as well as Derry City from Northern Ireland). Organised by the FAI (Football Association of Ireland), the competition is currently sponsored by Extra.ie. It was known as the Free State Cup from 1923 to 1936. Shamrock Rovers hold the record of most wins with 25.

As of November 2022, the current holders are Derry City F.C.

Venues 
Since the early 1920s until the 1980s, all but a handful of FAI Cup finals were held at Dalymount Park, Dublin. Two replays in the 1920s were held at Shelbourne Park, the 1973 replay was held in Flower Lodge in Cork and the 1984 replay was in Tolka Park. However, since 1990, due to the lack of development of Dalymount, the final has been played at a number of different venues. From 1990 until 1997 it was played at Lansdowne Road stadium, from 1997 to 1999 back at Dalymount, from 1999 to 2002 at Tolka Park and from 2003 to 2006 back at Lansdowne Road. Due to the redevelopment of Lansdowne, the 2007 and 2008 finals were played at the RDS Arena. The 2009 final took place in Tallaght Stadium. Finals from 2010 onwards take place at the Aviva Stadium.

History 
Shelbourne, Bohemian and Derry City are the only clubs to have won both the (Northern) Irish Cup and the FAI Cup, although Shelbourne and Bohemians only won it before partition, while Derry City remained in the Northern Irish league system until 1973, entering the League of Ireland in 1985. Alton United based in Belfast and Derry City are the only sides from outside the Republic of Ireland to win the competition.

Athlone Town A.F.C. in 1924, Dundalk F.C. in 1958, Shamrock Rovers F.C. in 1968 and Sligo Rovers in 2010 are the only sides ever to win the Cup without conceding a goal.

Since 2003, Irish domestic football has moved from the traditional European August–May season to a summer set-up, as favoured in Scandinavia. As an "interim" season was played in the second half of 2002, two FAI Cup Finals took place that year – Dundalk winning in April, and Derry City lifting the trophy in November.

Following the 1985 expansion of the League of Ireland to two Divisions, Bray Wanderers were the first First Division team to win the Cup, defeating non-League St. Francis in 1990.  Bray were also the first team to win the Cup in a season that saw them relegated, in 1999.  Dundalk were relegated in 2002 while winning the first of that year's trophies.

After two defeats in Cup Finals in the 1970s, Drogheda United finally reached the summit in 2005. Goals from Gavin Whelan (whose father, Paul, captained Bohemians to the 1992 cup and whose grandfather, Ronnie, won two cups with St. Patrick's Athletic) and captain Declan O'Brien helped "the Drogs" to a 2–0 win over Cork City.

The last soccer game to be played at the old Lansdowne Road was the 2006 final, contested between St. Patrick's Athletic and Derry City, who ran out eventual 4–3 winners after extra-time. The original FAI Cup was also retired after the game with a brand new version of the trophy to be used in the following seasons.

The largest ever win in the competition occurred on 29 November 2020 when Dundalk beat Athlone Town 11:0 at the semi-final stage.

Eligibility 
40 clubs compete in the FAI Cup. All clubs in the League of Ireland are automatically eligible. Clubs from Level 3–7 (non-league football) are also eligible provided they qualify from either the FAI Intermediate Cup or FAI Junior Cup competitions in the current season. All participating clubs must also have a stadium suitable for the competition.

The total number of entries in the FAI Cup has changed as Non-League football has gradually been expanded and reorganised over time. In the 2022 season, 39 clubs entered the competition. It is very rare for top clubs to miss the competition, although it can happen in exceptional circumstances.

Northern Irish sides that play in Republic of Ireland leagues are eligible. There is only one club currently competing: Derry City.

Eligibility for the FAI Cup

Qualification for subsequent competitions

European football 
The FAI Cup winners qualify for the following season's UEFA Europa Conference League. This European place applies even if the team is relegated or is not in the Republic of Ireland top flight. In the past, if the FAI Cup winning team also qualified for the following season's Champions League or Europa Conference League through their league or European performance, then the losing FAI Cup finalists were given the European berth of the FAI Cup winners. Now the FA Cup berth is then given to the highest-place team in the league who has not yet qualified. FAI Cup winners enter the Europa Conference League at the first qualifying round.

Presidents Cup 
The FAI Cup winners also qualify for the following season's single-match President of Ireland's Cup, the traditional season opener played against the previous season's Premier Division champions (or the Premier Divisions runners-up if the FAI Cup winners also won the league – the double).

FAI Cup Finals

Performances

Performance by club

Notes:
 1 Since 1985 when Derry City joined the league.
 2 Includes Waterford.
 3 Includes Limerick United.
 4 Includes Drogheda.
 5 Includes Evergreen United.

References

External links

Ireland – List of Cup Finals
Ireland – FAI Cup 1921/22-1993/94
FAI announce 1st digital sponsor with the extra.ie FAI cup
"'You can't lose, you'll make the league look bad'", RTÉ Sport, 13 May 2020.
https://worldsportsweekly.com/fai-cup-previous-winners
 https://www.otbsports.com/soccer/the-nearly-neverending-epic-when-bray-wanderers-last-won-a-major-trophy-257383

 
1
1